Ahmad Izzat Pasha bin Hawlu Pasha al-Abid (or ; 1851–1924), nicknamed Izzat Pasha the Arab, was a Syrian entrepreneur who became Second Secretary and confidant of Ottoman Sultan Abdulhamid II. He is considered to have been "one of the most powerful" statesmen during the last decade of Abdulhamid's rule.

Life
Ahmad Izzat al-Abid was born in Damascus. His father was Hawlu Pasha al-Abid. Ahmad Izzat was educated in Beirut. He spoke Arabic, French and Turkish. He moved to Istanbul where he served the Ottoman sultan, Abdulhamid II as an adviser. He left the Ottoman Empire following the Young Turk Revolution in 1908 and moved to London for some time before living in France and Switzerland. He then left for Egypt, where he died in 1924. 

Abid accumulated great wealth during his life. He was also a businessman and owned numerous enterprises or buildings including the largest tourist hotel in Syria at the time, the Victoria Hotel in Damascus. 

He was the father of Muhammad Ali Bay al-Abid, who served as the first president of the mandatory Syrian Republic.

Notes

References

Bibliography
 

1851 births
1924 deaths
Syrian businesspeople
Political people from the Ottoman Empire
Ottoman expatriates in the United Kingdom
Ottoman expatriates in France
Ottoman expatriates in Switzerland
Arabs from the Ottoman Empire
Mabeyn-i hümayun katipleri